The 2020 BET Hip Hop Awards is a recognition ceremony that was held on October 27, 2020 as the 15th instalment of the BET Hip Hop Awards. The nominations were announced on September 29, 2020. Hosted by Wild 'N Out cast members and hosts of 85 South Comedy Show podcast: Chico Bean, Karlous Miller and DC Young Fly.

DaBaby lead the number of nominations with twelve, with Roddy Ricch earning eleven, and both Megan Thee Stallion and Drake receiving eight each.

Winners and nominees

Hip Hop Artist of the Year 
 Megan Thee Stallion
 DaBaby
 Drake
 Future
 Lil Baby
 Roddy Ricch

Hip Hop Album of the Year 
 Roddy Ricch – Please Excuse Me for Being Antisocial
 Future – High Off Life
 DaBaby – Blame It on Baby
 DaBaby – Kirk
 Lil Baby – My Turn
 Megan Thee Stallion – Suga

Best Hip Hop Video 
 Future featuring Drake – "Life Is Good"
 DaBaby – "Bop"
 DaBaby featuring Roddy Ricch – "Rockstar"
 Drake – "Toosie Slide"
 Lil Baby – "The Bigger Picture"
 Roddy Ricch – "The Box"

Best Collaboration 
 Megan Thee Stallion featuring Beyoncé – "Savage (Remix)"
 DaBaby featuring Roddy Ricch – "Rockstar"
 Future featuring Drake – "Life Is Good"
 Jack Harlow  featuring Tory Lanez, DaBaby and Lil Wayne – "Whats Poppin (Remix)"
 Megan Thee Stallion featuring Nicki Minaj and Ty Dolla $ign – "Hot Girl Summer"
 Mustard featuring Roddy Ricch – "Ballin'"

Best Duo/Group 
 Chris Brown and Young Thug
 City Girls
 EarthGang
 JackBoys
 Migos
 Run the Jewels

Best Live Performer 
 Travis Scott
 Big Sean
 DaBaby
 Drake
 Megan Thee Stallion
 Roddy Ricch

Lyricist of the Year 
 Rapsody
 Big Sean
 DaBaby
 Drake
 J. Cole
 Megan Thee Stallion

Video Director of the Year 
 Teyana Taylor
 Cactus Jack & White Trash Tyler
 Cole Bennett
 Colin Tilley
 Dave Meyers
 Director X

DJ of the Year 
 D-Nice
 Chase B
 DJ Drama
 DJ Envy
 DJ Khaled
 Mustard

Producer of the Year 
 Hit-Boy
 9th Wonder
 DJ Khaled
 JetsonMade
 Mike Will Made It
 Mustard

Song of the Year 
 The Box" – Produced by 30 Roc and DatBoiSqueeze (Roddy Ricch)
Only the producer of the track nominated in this category.
 "Bop" – Produced by JetsonMade and Starboy (DaBaby)
 "Life Is Good" – Produced by Ambezza, D. Hill and OZ (Future featuring Drake)
 "Rockstar" – Produced by SethInTheKitchen (DaBaby featuring Roddy Ricch)
 "Savage (Remix)" – Produced by J. White Did It (Megan Thee Stallion featuring Beyoncé)
 "Toosie Slide" – Produced by OZ (Drake)

Best New Hip Hop Artist 
 Pop Smoke
 Flo Milli
 Jack Harlow
 NLE Choppa
 Mulatto
 Rod Wave

Hustler of the Year 
 Megan Thee Stallion
 Cardi B
 DJ Khaled
 JAY-Z
 Rick Ross
 Travis Scott

Sweet 16: Best Featured Verse 
 Beyoncé – "Savage (Remix)" (Megan Thee Stallion featuring Beyoncé)
 Bia – "Best on Earth" (Russ featuring Bia)
 Cardi B – "Writing on the Wall" (French Montana featuring Post Malone, Cardi B and Rvssian)
 Future – "Roses (Remix)" (Saint Jhn featuring Future)
 Travis Scott – "Hot (Remix)" (Young Thug featuring Gunna and Travis Scott)
 Roddy Ricch – "Rockstar" (DaBaby featuring Roddy Ricch)

Impact Track 
 Lil Baby – "The Bigger Picture"
 Anderson .Paak and Jay Rock – "Lockdown"
 J. Cole – "Snow on tha Bluff"
 DaBaby featuring Roddy Ricch – "Rockstar (BLM Remix)"
 Rapsody featuring PJ Morton – "Afeni"
 Wale featuring Kelly Price – "Sue Me"

Best International Flow
 Stormzy (UK)
 Djonga (Brazil)
 Kaaris (France)
 Khaligraph Jones (Kenya)
 Meryl (France)
 Ms Banks (UK)
 Nasty C (South Africa)

Best Hip-Hop Platform
 The Joe Budden Podcast
 HipHopDX
 HotNewHipHop
 XXL
 The Breakfast Club
 The Shade Room
 Complex

I Am Hip Hop Icon
 Master P

References

BET Hip Hop Awards
2020 music awards
2020 awards in the United States